Marcelo Nildo Quinteros (born 23 December 1976 in Cañada de Gómez, Santa Fe) is an Argentine football midfielder.

Quinteros started his professional playing career in 2000 with Rosario Central. In 2003, he had a spell with Deportivo Cuenca in Ecuador before joining Gimnasia y Esgrima de Jujuy in 2004.

In 2005 Quinteros was part of the Gimnasia team that won the 2nd division Clausura 2005 and obtained promotion to the Argentine Primera.

In 2009, he joined Banfield after failing to prevent the relegation of previous club, San Martín de Tucumán. He played in every game of the Apertura 2009 championship, helping Banfield to win the Argentine league championship for the first time in their history.

Honours
Gimnasia y Esgrima de Jujuy
Primera B Nacional: Clausura 2005
Banfield
Primera División Argentina: Apertura 2009

External links
 Argentine Primera statistics
 Football-Lineups player profile

1976 births
Living people
People from Iriondo Department
Argentine footballers
Association football midfielders
Rosario Central footballers
C.D. Cuenca footballers
Gimnasia y Esgrima de Jujuy footballers
San Martín de Tucumán footballers
Club Atlético Banfield footballers
Argentine Primera División players
Argentine expatriate footballers
Expatriate footballers in Ecuador
Sportspeople from Santa Fe Province